Laurent Marcangeli (born 10 December 1980) is a French politician. He was mayor of Ajaccio, the capital of Corsica, in 2014 and since 2015 to present. He was a deputy in the National Assembly from 2012 to 2017 and again from 2022, representing Corse-du-Sud's 1st constituency. He was a member of the nationwide right-wing parties Rally for the Republic, Union for a Popular Movement and The Republicans before starting his own party "Ajaccio !" in 2018. In 2022, he stood for the party Horizons, part of President Emmanuel Macron's Ensemble Citoyens coalition.

Biography
Marcangeli was born in Ajaccio, Corsica. He is a distant cousin of Marc Marcangeli, who was mayor from 1994 to 2000. His mother was a Corsican nationalist trade unionist for postal workers, and his father worked for the nationalist Edmond Simeoni. In contrast to his parents and his classmates at University of Corsica Pasquale Paoli, he joined the French right-wing party Rally for the Republic at 17. He studied Public Law and History and wrote a master's degree thesis on Charles de Gaulle's relations with Corsica.

Marcangeli was voted onto Ajaccio's city council in 2007 and the departmental council of Corse-du-Sud in 2011. In June 2012, he became Corsica's youngest member of the National Assembly, winning an election against Ajaccio's Socialist mayor Simon Renucci to represent Corse-du-Sud's 1st constituency. In March 2014, he was elected mayor of Ajaccio, beating Renucci by 47% to 46%.

The 2014 election was annulled by a court in October of that year due to irregularities, and Marcangeli resigned. The election was run again in February 2015, and he won by 59.25% to 40.75%.

Marcangeli endorsed former Prime Minister Alain Juppé in the primaries to represent The Republicans in the 2017 French presidential election. In the election itself, he backed François Fillon, but publicly withdrew support in March 2017.

In February 2018, Marcangeli quit The Republicans due to disagreements with party president Laurent Wauquiez. In September, he set up a new party, "Ajaccio !".

Marcangeli took part in the 2021 regional elections as a candidate for president of the Corsican Executive Council. His nomination, Un soffiu novu, was endorsed by the Republicans, the Bonapartist Central Committee and the Union of Democrats and Independents. He received 24.86% of the vote in the first round, behind incumbent Gilles Simeoni of Femu a Corsica (29.19%). In the run-off, he came second of four candidates behind Simeoni (40.64% to 32.02%).

Marcangeli stood again in Corse-du-Sud's 1st constituency in the 2022 French legislative election as a member of Horizons, within President Emmanuel Macron's Ensemble Citoyens coalition. He came first in the first round with 33.7% of the vote, to face Romain Colonna of Femu a Corsica (17.48%) in the second round. He won the run-off with 51.8% of the votes.

References

1980 births
Living people
Mayors of Ajaccio
Deputies of the 14th National Assembly of the French Fifth Republic
Rally for the Republic politicians
Union for a Popular Movement politicians
The Republicans (France) politicians
Horizons politicians
21st-century French politicians
Deputies of the 16th National Assembly of the French Fifth Republic